Francis McNulty may refer to:

 Francis McNulty (Kansas politician) (1842/6–1885), American pioneer and member of the Kansas Legislature
 Francis J. McNulty, Delaware state legislator
 Francis McNulty Jr., member of the Iowa House of Representatives, 1896–1898